Maskati is a surname. Notable people with the surname include:

 Majid Al Maskati, part of the duo Majid Jordan
 Mohammed al-Maskati, Bahraini activist
 Omar Maskati (born 1989), American actor